Oleg Ivanovich Yakovlev (born 5 July 1970) is a Russian professional football manager and a former player.

Yakovlev played in the Russian First League with FC Zvezda Irkutsk.

External links
 

1970 births
Living people
Soviet footballers
Russian footballers
FC Zvezda Irkutsk players
Russian football managers
Association football defenders
Sportspeople from Irkutsk